Platysphinx vicaria is a moth of the family Sphingidae. It is known from Sierra Leone to Nigeria, Cameroon and the Central African Republic.

Subspecies
Platysphinx vicaria vicaria
Platysphinx vicaria basquini Pierre, 1989 (Gabon)

References

Platysphinx
Moths described in 1920
Insects of Cameroon
Moths of Africa
Insects of West Africa
Fauna of the Central African Republic
Fauna of Gabon